The 2013–14 season is Fenerbahçe's 56th consecutive season in the Süper Lig and their 106th year in existence. They also competed in the UEFA Champions League starting in the third qualifying round after being second in the 2012–13 domestic season. At the same time, Fenerbahçe was banned from European football, the Champions League third qualifying round spots shifted down after a match-fixing scandal. On 18 July 2013, Fenerbahçe's will enter the Champions League third qualifying round on Friday despite its UEFA ban for match-fixing scandal after winning an emergency ruling from the Court of Arbitration for Sport.

Season overview

 On 22 May 2013, Alper Potuk completed a move to Fenerbahçe in 5-year contract. The transfer involved Henri Bienvenu moving in the opposite direction, to Eskişehirspor, while Fenerbahçe also paid €6.25 million.
 On 29 May 2013, Aykut Kocaman submits his resignation as Fenerbahçe coach, saying that he is ‘exhausted.’ The former goal-scoring great is set to leave the club only a week after leading the Istanbul club to a second successive Turkish Cup.
 On 6 June 2013, Fenerbahçe has come to an end on the negotiations with Zenit’s Bruno Alves. Our club has 3 years agreement with 32 years old Portuguese player, for a fee of €5.5 million.
 On 14 June 2013, Fenerbahçe has agreed on the terms of transfer of Czech left wing Michal Kadlec for 3 years, with €4.5 million transfer fee in 3 years contract.
 On 18 June 2013, Fenerbahçe has agreed on the terms with Swedish midfielder Samuel Holmén. The contract will be valid for 3 years.
 On 25 June 2013, UEFA announced on Wednesday that Turkish side Fenerbahçe has been banned from next two season's Champions League over match-fixing allegations. Fenerbahçe have been handed a two-year ban and will miss this season's Champions League, where they were due to enter in the third qualifying round. A third year has been suspended over a five-year probation period.
 On 28 June 2013, Ersun Yanal has agreed to take charge of Fenerbahçe, replacing Aykut Kocaman who resigned at the end of May, the club said on Friday. His appointment coincides with tough times for the Fenerbahçe who have been banned from European competition for two seasons over their involvement in a domestic match-fixing scandal. Fenerbahçe, who finished second in the Süper Lig last season, will miss out on next season's Champions League which they had been due to enter in the third qualifying round.
 On 1 July 2013, Fenerbahçe, open new season with training session. Yanal, addressing his players, said the absolute goal was winning the Süper Lig championship. “I have gotten to know you. You will get to know me and we will get to know each other much better. Let's keep our eyes on the prize and hope for the best next season,” he noted.
 On 11 July 2013, Fenerbahçe which applied to the Union of European Football Associations Appeals Body after it was banned from European club competitions by the UEFA disciplinary board last month, defended itself for seven hours during a hearing held in Nyon, Switzerland, on Wednesday.
 On 15 July 2013, Turkish clubs Fenerbahçe and Beşiktaş have failed in their bids to overturn bans from European competition, The Union of European Football Associations said on Monday. Fenerbahçe, who were due to compete in this season's Champions League, were banned from European soccer for two seasons and Beşiktaş, who had qualified for the Europa League, for one season.
 On 18 July 2013, Fenerbahçe said today the Court of Arbitration for Sport (CAS) had suspended the execution of UEFAs decision banning the club from European competition for two years over their involvement in a domestic match-fixing scandal. "Fenerbahçe soccer team will attend the UEFA Champions League draws on Friday and continue on its path," Fenerbahçe chairman Aziz Yıldırım told the club's official television channel.
 On 19 July 2013, Fenerbahçe has been pitted against Red Bull Salzburg in the UEFA Champions League Third qualifying round, after the top-level UEFA competition draw was made on July 19, a day after its match-fixing scandal ban was stayed.
 On 24 July 2013, Within the scope of pre-season camp, Fenerbahçe has competed to Dutch representative PSV at Şükrü Saracoğlu Stadium. Our team left the ground with 0–2 loss where our opponent’s goals came from Tim Matavž in the minute of 15 and Jürgen Locadia in 71st minute. Prior to the friendly, our Professional Football Team’s 2013–14 Jersey’s has been launched with a giant show.
 On 31 July 2013, The Ersun Yanal's first official match, Fenerbahçe made the most of their UEFA Champions League lifeline with a 1–1 draw against Red Bull Salzburg in the first leg of their Third qualifying round tie on Wednesday.
 On 6 August 2013, Fenerbahçe defeated Red Bull Salzburg in UEFA Champions League Third qualifying round with a 3–1 win. Also this match was the first official win the game for the new manager Ersun Yanal.
 On 7 August 2013, Emmanuel Emenike came back to Fenerbahçe for four-year deal after playing 2 seasons for Spartak Moscow. Fenerbahçe agreed to pay €13 million, while Emenike will get €2.4 million each season. On the same date Miroslav Stoch was loaned out to PAOK for €1 million.
 On 9 August 2013, Fenerbahçe have been drawn against Arsenal in the play-off round of the Champions League for a place in the elite 32-team group stages. The first leg was played on 21 August 2013 and the second on 28 August 2013.
 On 11 August 2013, Fenerbahçe and Galatasaray kicked off the new season of Turkish soccer in the Super Cup which was played in Kayseri. This was the 375th meeting between the two sides in history. Both sides played decent attacking soccer, but it was Galatasaray who had the last laugh with Didier Drogba heading home the only goal in the first half of Extra Time.
 On 18 August 2013, Ersun Yanal's first league match with Fenerbahçe, paid the price for its distraction as they squandered a 2–0 first half lead to eventually lose 3–2 to newcomer Torku Konyaspor in their Süper Lig opener at Konya Atatürk Stadium on Saturday evening.
 On 18 August 2013, Fenerbahçe will have a mountain to climb to reach the group stages of the Champions League after being crushed 3–0 by an efficient Arsenal at their caldron of Şükrü Saracoğlu Stadium in the first leg of the play-off round.
 On 27 August 2013, Fenerbahçe in desperate bid against rival Arsenal with lose 2–0 and 5–0 on aggregate, also on 28 August, they will be unable to compete in the UEFA Europa League this season after the Court of Arbitration for Sport upheld a UEFA-imposed two-year ban from European competition over a match-fixing scandal on Wednesday.
 On 3 November 2013, Aziz Yıldırım has been re-elected as Fenerbahçe chairman for a record 11th term, which ensures that he will become the longest-serving figure heading one of Turkey's biggest and most popular clubs.
 On 27 April 2014, Yanal's team Fenerbahçe won the Süper Lig title with three games to spare on Sunday after a 0–0 draw at home to Çaykur Rizespor, in front of a crowd made up exclusively of women and children.

Kits 

Supplier: Adidas
Main sponsor: Türk Telekom

Back sponsor: Ülker
Sleeve sponsor: Avea

Short sponsor: MNG Kargo
Socks sponsor: –

Transfers

Total spending:  €29,250,000

Total income:  €3,300,000

Line-up

Squad

First team squad

Reserve squad

Squad statistics

Statistics

Goals

Assists

Club hierarchy

Board of directors

Management

Overall

Pre-season friendlies

Süper Kupa

 On 11 August 2013, Fenerbahçe and Galatasaray kicked off the new season of Turkish soccer in the Super Cup which was played in Kayseri. This was the 375th meeting between the two sides in history. Both sides played decent attacking soccer, but it was Galatasaray who had the last laugh with Didier Drogba heading home the only goal in the first half of Extra Time.

Süper Lig

League table

Results summary

Results by round

Matches

Türkiye Kupası

On 4 December 2013, Fenerbahçe suffered an unexpected 2–1 reverse in their Turkish Cup game at their home Şükrü Saracoğlu Stadium against first division minnows of Fethiyespor with the result, the double title-holders fall as they had entered the competition in the fourth round stage.

UEFA Champions League

 On 31 July 2013, The Ersun Yanal's first official match, Fenerbahçe made the most of their UEFA Champions League lifeline with a 1–1 draw against Red Bull Salzburg in the first leg of their Third qualifying round tie on Wednesday. On 6 August 2013, Fenerbahçe defeated Red Bull Salzburg in UEFA Champions League Third qualifying round with a 3–1 win. Also this match was the first official win the game for the new manager Ersun Yanal. On 9 August 2013, Fenerbahçe have been drawn against Arsenal in the play-off round of the Champions League for a place in the elite 32-team group stages. The first leg was played on 21 August 2013 and the second on 28 August 2013. On 18 August 2013, Fenerbahçe will have a mountain to climb to reach the group stages of the Champions League after being crushed 3–0 by an efficient Arsenal at their caldron of Şükrü Saracoğlu Stadium in the first leg of the play-off round. On 27 August 2013, Fenerbahçe in desperate bid against rival Arsenal with lose 2–0 and 5–0 on aggregate, also on 28 August, they will be unable to compete in the UEFA Europa League this season after the Court of Arbitration for Sport upheld a UEFA-imposed two-year ban from European competition over a match-fixing scandal on Wednesday.

Third qualifying round

Fenerbahçe won 4–2 on aggregate.

Play-off round

Fenerbahçe lose 0–5 on aggregate.

See also
 2013 Süper Kupa
 2013–14 Süper Lig
 2013–14 Türkiye Kupası
 2013–14 UEFA Champions League

References

Fenerbahçe S.K. (football) seasons
Fenerbahce
Turkish football championship-winning seasons